Doctor Frigo is a 1974 novel by Eric Ambler.

Plot
Dr. Ernesto Castillo is a young, competent, cynical physician living and practicing on the fictional French-Caribbean Island St. Paul-les-Alizés.  His nickname, "Dr. Frigo", means, literally, "Dr. Frozen-Meat", which refers to his clipped, unsympathetic demeanor with patients and colleagues. The country he lives in is not his native land; he lives in exile, because his father, a left-wing revolutionary activist, led an unsuccessful uprising against the ruling junta, and was assassinated, some years before. At the time of the father's death, Castillo was just beginning his medical training at a prestigious medical school in a wealthier part of the world. He spends most of his free time with his girlfriend, a beautiful but moody art-dealer, descended from a leading member of the Habsburg dynasty and neurotically obsessed with its history.

Now, oil has been discovered in Dr. Castillo's native land, and the father's former comrades are planning a second insurgency.  Their leader, who was a close friend of Dr. Castillo's father, comes to Dr. Castillo as a patient, with some puzzling symptoms. At the same time, his father's former comrades seek to recruit him: as the son of the assassinated leader, he would be a useful figurehead to lead the next revolt.

Dr. Castillo discovers that his new patient's illness is more than just an excuse for contacting him: in fact the patient has early-stage amyotrophic lateral sclerosis (ALS, familiar to readers today as the same neurodegenerative illness which afflicted Stephen Hawking and Lou Gehrig), and will soon be completely and permanently incapacitated. When the other would-be revolutionaries perceive the progressive degeneration, it becomes even more urgent for them to recruit Dr. Castillo to their cause to replace the ailing charismatic leader. At the same time, agents of the government compel Dr. Castillo to meet with the revolutionaries, in order to help the government monitor the revolutionaries' activity — effectively, to serve as a spy. Caught between the government's threats and his professional obligations to his patient (including confidentiality), he reluctantly agrees to work with the revolutionaries.

Eventually, Dr. Castillo learns that his patient, not the junta, ordered his father's assassination. Before Dr. Castillo can decide what to do about this, the patient is himself assassinated by a traitor within his group. Happily relieved of the need to resolve his dilemma, Dr. Castillo returns to his medical practice and his fiancée.

Reception
It is regarded as one of Ambler's best works.

Kirkus Reviews described the book as "urbane, amusing, cautionary and threateningly urgent".

References

English thriller novels
1974 British novels
Novels by Eric Ambler
Weidenfeld & Nicolson books